The Cocoraque Butte Archaeological District is located in Ironwood Forest National Monument, in Pima County, Arizona. Added to the National Register of Historic Places on October 10, 1975, it features ancient Hohokam ruins, hundreds of well-preserved petroglyphs, and the historic Cocoraque Ranch. The age of the petroglyphs range from 1150 to 2000 years old.

See also

 National Register of Historic Places listings in Pima County, Arizona
 Painted Rock Petroglyph Site

References

Archaeological sites in Arizona
Archaeological sites on the National Register of Historic Places in Arizona
Ranches on the National Register of Historic Places in Arizona
Petroglyphs in Arizona
Hohokam rock art sites
History of Pima County, Arizona
Landforms of Pima County, Arizona
Buttes of Arizona
1975 establishments in Arizona
National Register of Historic Places in Pima County, Arizona